Indigofera hilaris, the red bush indigo or gay indigofera, is a species of leguminous shrublet in the genus Indigofera (family Fabaceae).

Etymology 
The genus name Indigofera is Neo-Latin for "bearing indigo" (indigo is a purple dye originally obtained from some Indigofera species). Hilaris, from the Ancient Greek, means "cheerful, merry", referring to the bright, colourful display of the flowers.

Description 

Indigofera hilaris is a perennial shrublet with erect annual stems up to 60 cm from a thick woody rootstock. Leaves are pinnate, with one to four pairs of narrow elliptical, silky and often folded leaflets; basal leaves are reduced, becoming scaly. Stipules are 2–9 mm long, linear and stiff. Inflorescences are short-stalked densely-flowered 1.5–5 cm long racemes, scarcely longer than the leaves. Flowers are reddish-pink to carmine, 7–8 mm long and about 6 mm in diameter. Pods are 10–30 mm long, cylindrical and straight. Flowers bloom from July to December, especially after fires.

Distribution 
Indigofera hilaris grows in open grasslands through eastern South and tropical Africa in Tanzania, Zambia, Zaire, Malawi, Mozambique, Zimbabwe, Eswatini, Lesotho and South Africa (Limpopo, Mpumalanga, Gauteng, North-West, Free State, KwaZulu-Natal, Eastern Cape).

References

External links

 Flora of Zimbabwe: Indigofera hilaris Eckl. & Zeyh.

hilaris
Flora of South Africa